Éric Bertrand may refer to:
 Éric Bertrand (ice hockey)
 Éric Bertrand (footballer)